The 19th Emmy Awards, later known as the 19th Primetime Emmy Awards, were handed out on June 4, 1967, at the Century Plaza Hotel in Los Angeles, California.  The ceremony was hosted by Joey Bishop and Hugh Downs.  Winners are listed in bold and series' networks are in parentheses.

The top show of the night was Mission: Impossible, which won three major awards. Don Knotts won his fifth Emmy for Outstanding Performance by an Actor in a Supporting Role in a Comedy. This record still stands.

Winners and nominees

Programs

Acting

Lead performances

Supporting performances

Single performances

Directing

Writing

Most major nominations
By network 
 CBS – 44
 NBC – 31
 ABC – 22

 By program
 CBS Playhouse (CBS) – 6
 ABC Stage 67 (ABC) / Bewitched (ABC) / I Spy (NBC) – 5
 Death of a Salesman (CBS) / Hallmark Hall of Fame (NBC) / Mission: Impossible (CBS) – 4

Most major awards
By network 
 CBS – 11
 NBC – 9
 ABC – 4

 By program
 Mission: Impossible (CBS) – 3
 The Andy Griffith Show (CBS) / Brigadoon (ABC) / Death of a Salesman (CBS) / Get Smart (NBC)The Monkees (NBC) / The Sid Caesar, Imogene Coca, Carl Reiner, Howard Morris Special (CBS) – 2

Notes

References

External links
 Emmys.com list of 1967 Nominees & Winners
 

019
Primetime Emmy Awards
Primetime Emmy
Primetime Emmy
Primetime Emmy Awards